The Judgment of Paris is a story in Greek mythology related to the Trojan War.

Judgment of Paris may also refer to:

Art
 Judgement of Paris (mosaic), a mosaic from the early second century AD discovered in Antioch 
 Judgement of Paris Amphora, an Attic black-figure amphora 
 The Judgement of Paris (Boucher), a painting by François Boucher
 The Judgment of Paris (Rubens), two paintings by Peter Paul Rubens
 El Juicio de Paris (Simonet), a painting by Enrique Simonet

Literature
 The Judgement of Paris, a poem by James Beattie
 The Judgment of Paris, a novel by Gore Vidal
 The Judgment of Paris: The Revolutionary Decade That Gave the World Impressionism by Ross King

Music
 The Judgement of Paris a ballet choreographed by Sir Frederick Ashton with music by Lennox Berkeley
 The Judgement of Paris (opera), an opera libretto by William Congreve, set to music by five British Baroque composers

Wine
 Judgment of Paris (wine), a 1976 wine tasting event that increased the visibility of American and California wines